Caecorhamdella brasiliensis is a species of freshwater catfish in the family Pimelodidae.

It is endemic to São Paulo state in southeastern Brazil.

References

Sources

Caecorhamdella
Catfish of South America
Endemic fauna of Brazil
Freshwater fish of Brazil
Environment of São Paulo (state)
Taxonomy articles created by Polbot